There are about 50 known moth species in Chad. The moths (mostly nocturnal) and butterflies (mostly diurnal) together make up the taxonomic order Lepidoptera.

This is a list of moth species which have been recorded in Chad.

Arctiidae
Afrasura obliterata (Walker, 1864)
Balacra pulchra Aurivillius, 1892

Coleophoridae
Nasamonica oxymorpha Meyrick, 1922

Geometridae
Brachyglossina tibbuana Herbulot, 1965
Heterostegane monilifera Prout, 1915
Neromia pulvereisparsa (Hampson, 1896)
Trimetopia aetheraria Guenée, 1858
Zamarada minimaria Swinhoe, 1895

Lasiocampidae
Pachymetana joiceyi (Tams, 1925)

Metarbelidae
Moyencharia mineti Lehmann, 2013
Salagena cuprea Gaede, 1929

Noctuidae
Aegocera rectilinea Boisduval, 1836
Agrotis sardzeana Brandt, 1941
Callhyccoda mirei Herbulot & Viette, 1952
Cardepia sociabilis de Graslin, 1850
Clytie sancta (Staudinger, 1900)
Cyligramma latona (Cramer, 1775)
Diparopsis watersi (Rothschild, 1901)
Eublemma scitula (Rambur, 1833)
Grammodes stolida (Fabricius, 1775)
Helicoverpa armigera (Hübner, [1808])
Helicoverpa assulta (Guenée, 1852)
Heliocheilus confertissima (Walker, 1865)
Heliothis peltigera ([Denis & Schiffermüller], 1775)
Heteropalpia acrosticta (Püngeler, 1904)
Metopoceras kneuckeri (Rebel, 1903)
Oraesia intrusa (Krüger, 1939)
Pandesma robusta (Walker, 1858)
Polytela cliens (Felder & Rogenhofer, 1874)
Spodoptera exigua (Hübner, 1808)
Spodoptera littoralis (Boisduval, 1833)
Thiacidas kanoensis Hacker & Zilli, 2007

Nolidae
Earias insulana (Boisduval, 1833)

Notodontidae
Desmeocraera bitioides (Holland, 1893)

Pterophoridae
Hepalastis pumilio (Zeller, 1873)
Megalorhipida leucodactylus (Fabricius, 1794)
Pterophorus albidus (Zeller, 1852)
Pterophorus candidalis (Walker, 1864)
Sphenarches anisodactylus (Walker, 1864)
Stenoptilodes taprobanes (Felder & Rogenhofer, 1875)

Saturniidae
Aurivillius xerophilus Rougeot, 1977
Bunaeopsis hersilia (Westwood, 1849)
Epiphora bauhiniae (Guérin-Méneville, 1832)
Orthogonioptilum chalix Jordan, 1922
Pseudimbrasia deyrollei (J. Thomson, 1858)
Pseudobunaea heyeri (Weymer, 1896)

Sphingidae
Neopolyptychus prionites (Rothschild & Jordan, 1916)

References

External links 
 

Moths
Moths
Chad
Chad